One Sweet Hello is an album by American country singer Ernest Tubb, released in 1971 (see 1971 in music).

Track listing
"One Sweet Hello" (Merle Haggard)
"When Ole Goin' Gets a Goin'" (Eddie Miller)
"Commercial Affection" (Mel Tillis)
"Key's in the Mailbox" (Harlan Howard)
"Help Me Make It Through the Night" (Kris Kristofferson)
"She Goes Walking Through My Mind" (Bill Eldridge, Gary Stewart, Walter Haynes)
"Don't Back a Man up in a Corner" (Howard)
"As Long as There's a Sunday" (Justin Tubb)
"Sometimes You Just Can't Win" (Smokey Stover)
"Touching Home" (Dallas Frazier, Arthur Leo Owens)
"Shenandoah Waltz" (Clyde Moody, Chubby Wise)

Personnel
Ernest Tubb – vocals, guitar
Jack Mollette – guitar
Ray Edenton – guitar
Buddy Charleton – pedal steel guitar
Joe Pruneda – bass
Harold Bradley – bass
Sonny Lonas – drums
Jerry Smith – piano
Hargus "Pig" Robbins – piano
Leon Boulanger – fiddle

References

Ernest Tubb albums
1971 albums
Albums produced by Owen Bradley
Decca Records albums